Thomas William Rhodes (25 April 1860 – 30 August 1944) was a New Zealand politician of the Liberal Party, then the Reform Party. He changed his affiliation to the Reform Party in 1915.

Early life
Rhodes was born in Parnell. In 1887, he founded the Coromandel Country News.

Political career

He represented the Thames electorate from 1911 to 1928, when he retired. He was Mayor of Thames from 1923 to 1927. In 1935, he was awarded the King George V Silver Jubilee Medal.

Death
Rhodes died at his home in 11 St Mary's Street, Wellington, on 30 August 1944, aged 84. He was cremated on 1 September 1944 at the Karori Crematorium.

References

1860 births
1944 deaths
Reform Party (New Zealand) MPs
New Zealand Liberal Party MPs
Mayors of Thames
Members of the New Zealand House of Representatives
New Zealand MPs for North Island electorates
People from Auckland